It is debated whether there are moral, ethical, or political lessons to be learned from the Holocaust, and if so what they are. In contemporary discourse, there are many references to proposed lessons to be learned from the Holocaust, which are less common in the work of Holocaust scholars. In his 2016 book of the same title, Michael Marrus classifies the lessons drawn from the Holocaust into the categories of early, Jewish, Israeli, and universal lessons. The existence of specific lessons to be learned from the Holocaust is cited as a justification for Holocaust education, but challenged by some critics. There is a tension between the argument that the Holocaust was a unique event in history and that it has lessons that could be applied to other situations.

References

The Holocaust